Arthur Shallett was a British Army general who served during the War of the Spanish Succession.  He was from Cornwall.  He was replaced by Charles Churchill (British Army general).

References
 

British Army generals
Buffs (Royal East Kent Regiment) officers
British military personnel of the War of the Spanish Succession
Year of birth missing
Year of death missing